Chaudhry Muhammad Shafiq Anwar is a Pakistani politician who had been a member of the Provincial Assembly of the Punjab from August 2018 till January 2023.

Political career
He was elected to the Provincial Assembly of the Punjab record 5th consecutive time as a candidate of Pakistan Muslim League (N) from Constituency PP-267 (Rahim Yar Khan-XIII) in 2018 Pakistani general election.

References

Living people
Pakistan Muslim League (N) MPAs (Punjab)
Year of birth missing (living people)